Alcubilla de las Peñas is a municipality located in the province of Soria, Castile and León, Spain. According to the 2004 census (INE), the municipality has a population of 82 inhabitants.

Places of interest
 Included in the Natura 200 Network:
 Site of Community Importance known as Altos de Radona, occupying 3239 hectares 
 Special Protection Area known as Altos de Radona occupying 4089 hectares
Torre de la Senda is an Emiral-Caliphate era watchtower which received Bien de Interés Cultural designation on June 1, 1983.

References

Municipalities in the Province of Soria